Baarìa can refer to:
 Baarìa, Sicily, presently known as Bagheria
 Baarìa (film) (2009), film by director Giuseppe Tornatore